Bulga may refer to:

Bulga, New South Wales, a locality in the Singleton Council region, New South Wales, Australia
Bulga, Victoria, a locality in the Rural City of Swan Hill, Victoria, Australia
Bulga Land District, a land district (cadastral division) of Western Australia
Bulga Coal, an Australian mining company
Tarra-Bulga National Park, a national park in eastern Victoria, Australia
Biriwal Bulga National Park a national park in New South Wales, Australia
Bulga (Ethiopia), a historical region in Ethiopia
Black Bulga State Conservation Area, a park in New South Wales, Australia
Gáe Bulg (Gáe Bulga), the spear of Cúchulainn in the Ulster Cycle of Irish mythology

See also
Bulgur, a wheat product
Bulgar (disambiguation)
Bolgar (disambiguation)